Systems Research and Behavioral Science is a scientific journal for theory and research in the fields of systems sciences. It is the official publication of the International Federation for Systems Research.

History

Systems Research and Behavioral Science originated from the merger of two journals, Systems Research (1974–1996) and Behavioral Science (1956–1996). The combined series commenced in January/February 1997 with volume 14, continuing the numbering of Systems Research. According to the Journal Citation Reports, the journal has a 2020 impact factor of 1.750, ranking it 65th out of 110 journals in the category "Social Sciences Interdisciplinary" and 194th of out of 226 journals in the category "Management".

See also 
 List of journals in systems science

References

External links 
 

Publications established in 1997
Systems journals
Wiley (publisher) academic journals
Bimonthly journals
English-language journals
Publications established in 1956
Publications established in 1974